Orongoy (Orongo) is a rural locality (a settlement) in Ivolginsky District, Republic of Buryatia, Russia. The population was 1,061 as of 2010. There are 5 streets.

Geography 
Orongoy is located 32 km southwest of Ivolginsk (the district's administrative centre) by road. Orongoy (ulus) is the nearest rural locality.

References 

Rural localities in Ivolginsky District